The lovely sunbird (Aethopyga shelleyi) is a bird species in the family Nectariniidae. It is endemic to the Philippines.
Its natural habitats are subtropical or tropical moist lowland forests and subtropical or tropical moist montane forests.

References

lovely sunbird
Endemic birds of the Philippines
lovely sunbird
Taxonomy articles created by Polbot